Shaldan va Baghi (also Romanized as Shaldān va Bāghī; also known as Shaldān, Sholdān, and Sholdūn) is a village in Shabankareh Rural District, Shabankareh District, Dashtestan County, Bushehr Province, Iran. At the 2006 census, its population was 38, in 6 families.

References 

Populated places in Dashtestan County